The German Embassy in Abuja is Germany's diplomatic mission to Nigeria.

The embassy is located at 9 Lake Maracaibo Close, off Amazon Street Maitama / Abuja F.C.T. The consulate-general is located in Lagos at 15, Walter Carrington Crescent, Victoria Island - Lagos, Nigeria.

The embassy is also home to a consulate various departments and a military attaché.

Current German Ambassador to Nigeria is Birgitt Ory.

References

External links 
 German Embassy in Nigeria
 Partnership with Africa

Abuja
Germany
Germany–Nigeria relations